The 1918 Villanova Wildcats football team represented the Villanova University during the 1918 college football season. The Wildcats team captains were William Cronin and Horace Cunningham.

Schedule

References

Villanova
Villanova Wildcats football seasons
Villanova Wildcats football